David Dalmo, born 1972, is a Swedish dancer, world champion in Lindy Hop (1995), former member of The Rhythm Hot Shots and member of the Bounce Streetdance Company. David D has choreographed this on So You Think You Can Dance - Scandinavia:
 Finale: Mynte Lagoni and Martin Gæbe (Hip-Hop), Mona-Jeanette Berntsen and Daniel Koivunen (Lindy Hop)

References 

Swedish male dancers
Living people
1972 births
So You Think You Can Dance choreographers